Gaona is a village and rural municipality in Anta Department, Salta Province, northwestern Argentina.

References

Populated places in Salta Province